Bódvarákó is a village in Borsod-Abaúj-Zemplén county, Hungary. The village is a UNESCO World Heritage Site.

Names and etymology
The name is of Slavic origin, see also Rakov Potok (Croatia) or Rakov (Czech Republic). Proto-Slavic *rakъ - crayfish. 1284/1464: Rako. The stem Bódva refers to the Bodva river basin.

References

External links 
 Street map 

Populated places in Borsod-Abaúj-Zemplén County
World Heritage Sites in Hungary